Dr. No is a 1984 role-playing game adventure for James Bond 007 published by Victory Games.

Plot summary
Dr. No is an adventure in which the player characters look for a missing agent in Jamaica and become the targets of the plans of Dr. No.

Reception
Steve Crow reviewed Dr. No in Space Gamer No. 71. Crow commented that "Be assured that you are getting your money's worth."

Reviews
Jeux & Stratégie #55

References

External links
Article in Dragon about spy games with comments on this adventure

James Bond 007 (role-playing game) adventures
Role-playing game supplements introduced in 1984